Thornberry is an unincorporated community at the intersection of Farm to Market Road 2393 and Farm to Market Road 171 in northwestern Clay County, Texas, United States, just south of the Oklahoma border. The population is approximately 60.

History
Thornberry was established in 1890 by settlers from Illinois with the name Illinois Colony. It was renamed Thornberry soon afterwards and a post office was opened in 1891.  It was named after Amos Thornberry, a local settler and orchardist who introduced large-scale orchard-based agriculture into the county. The post office closed in 1908. A proposed rail line linking Thornberry to Wichita Falls in Wichita County was never completed and the small town continued to suffer from its remote location. The population was reported as 20 until the 1960s. Today, Thornberry has a population of 60 with two businesses: The Clothesline (a ladies' wear shop) and Mr. Sweeney's Country Quilt Shop (a full-service quilt shop).  There is a Protestant church and community center near the center of town.

Education
Thornberry is served by the Burkburnett Independent School District in Wichita County, Texas, and the Petrolia Independent School District in Clay County Texas.

References

Unincorporated communities in Texas
Unincorporated communities in Clay County, Texas
Wichita Falls metropolitan area